The Liberty Formation is a geologic formation in Ohio and Indiana. It preserves fossils dating back to the Ordovician period.

See also

 List of fossiliferous stratigraphic units in Ohio
 List of fossiliferous stratigraphic units in Indiana

References
 

Ordovician Kentucky
Ordovician Ohio
Ordovician Indiana
Ordovician southern paleotemperate deposits
Ordovician southern paleotropical deposits